Stuart Dunkel is an oboist and painter based in Massachusetts. He has performed in a number of orchestras listed below.  He has been painting since age five and playing music since age 7.  He has written a book The Audition Process: Anxiety Management and Coping Strategies and released a CD of his music called Oboe Colors.  He owns two businesses: Oboe Cane and Reeds By Stuart Dunkel, and Fenway Grays.  He has taught at Boston University, The Longy Music School, The New England Conservatory of Music, and the Boston Conservatory of Music.

Music
He studied music at
Boston University, for his Bachelors in 1975
Mannes College of Music, for his Masters in 1985
Juilliard School of Music, for his Doctorate in 1987
Studied with
Robert Bloom
Elaine Douvas
Harold Gomberg
Ralph Gomberg
John Mack
Harry Shulman

Performed with
Boston Symphony Orchestra, 1974–1981, 1987–1988
Boston Pops Esplanade Orchestra, 1974–1981, 1987–1988
Boston Ballet
Detroit Symphony Orchestra
Florida Gulf Coast Symphony
Hong Kong Philharmonic Orchestra
Huntington Theatre Company
Metropolitan Opera Orchestra
Mostly Mozart Festival Orchestra
New Hampshire Symphony Orchestra
New Jersey Symphony Orchestra
New York Philharmonic Orchestra
Opera Company of Boston
Pro Arte Chamber Orchestra
Rhode Island Symphony Orchestra
Springfield Symphony Orchestra
Westfield Symphony Orchestra

Painting
He studied art at
Boston Museum School
Seattle Academy of Realist Art
Studied with
Tom Ouellette
Denise Mickilowski
Dennis Cheaney
Andrew Kusmin
Karen Winslow
Joe McGurl
Donald Demers
Sergio Roffo
Robert Douglas Hunter
Gayle Levee

References

External links
 

Boston University faculty
American classical oboists
Male oboists
Year of birth missing (living people)
Place of birth missing (living people)
Living people
Juilliard School alumni
Mannes School of Music alumni
21st-century American painters
21st-century American male artists
Painters from Massachusetts